The Sovereign 26 is an American trailerable sailboat that was designed by the Sovereign Design Group as a cruiser and first built in 1982.

Production
The design was built by Sovereign Yachts in the United States, starting in 1982, but it is now out of production.

Design
The Sovereign 26 is a recreational keelboat, built predominantly of fiberglass. It has a masthead sloop rig and a fixed fin keel. It displaces  and carries  of ballast.

See also
List of sailing boat types

References

Keelboats
1980s sailboat type designs
Sailing yachts 
Trailer sailers
Sailboat type designs by Sovereign Design Group
Sailboat types built by Sovereign Yachts